The 6th Indie Series Awards were held on April 1, 2015 at the El Portal Theater in Los Angeles, hosted by Eric Martsolf. Presented by We Love Soaps, the awards recognize independently produced, scripted entertainment created for the web.

Awards 
The nominations were announced in February 2015, and the awards were given on April 1, 2015. Winners are listed first and highlighted in boldface:

References

External links
 Indie Series Awards History and Archive of Past Winners

Indie Series Awards
2015 film awards